Patrice Gheisar (born June 15, 2975) is a Canadian soccer coach, who currently serves as head coach of HFX Wanderers FC in the Canadian Premier League.

Playing career 
Gheisar attended York University and played for the men's soccer team for five seasons.

He later played for the York Region Shooters in the Canadian Professional Soccer League.

Coaching career 
Gheisar began coaching with youth soccer club North York Hearts-Azzurri SC in 2005. Afterwards, he joined Vaughan Azzurri as a youth soccer coach where he remained in various roles for 16 years until 2022.

He also served as an assistant coach with Portugal FC/SC Toronto in the Canadian Soccer League under Carmine Isacco. In 2011, he was nominated for the Coach of the Year award while managing SC Toronto's reserve team in the CSL's second division. In 2012, he was named head coach of the first team, after Iascco moved to the role of Technical Director.

At the university level, he served as an assistant coach with the Ryerson Rams and York Lions.

In December 2018, he was announced as the head coach of the Seneca College's men's soccer team at the college level. With Seneca, Gheisar was named OCAA coach of the year in 2019.

He also served as coached Vaughan Azzurri in League1 Ontario, under Carmine Isacco (who he also worked with at SC Toronto and with the York Lions). In 2019, he was named head coach of the League1 Ontario side, taking over from Isacco. In 2019, Vaughan participated in the 2019 Canadian Championship, defeating professional club HFX Wanderers FC 1-0 on the road in the second leg, but were eliminated on away goals in the two-legged tie. In 2021, he was named East Division Coach of the Year, and the following season was named the overall league Coach of the Year. 

On November 30, 2022, he was named head coach of HFX Wanderers FC of the Canadian Premier League. At the time of his hiring, Wanderers president Derek Martin emphasized Gheiser's history of developing strong attacking teams and his recruitment ability as prime reasons for his hiring.

Coaching statistics
The following statistics are for club teams only (playoff matches are included).

References 

Living people
Canadian soccer coaches
HFX Wanderers FC non-playing staff
Canadian Premier League coaches
York Lions soccer players
York Region Shooters players
SC Toronto coaches
York Lions men's soccer coaches
Canadian Soccer League (1998–present) players
Canadian Soccer League (1998–present) managers
Year of birth missing (living people)